The 1962–63 West Midlands (Regional) League season was the 63rd in the history of the West Midlands (Regional) League, an English association football competition for semi-professional and amateur teams based in the West Midlands county, Shropshire, Herefordshire, Worcestershire and southern Staffordshire.

Also, it was the first season under this name after the Birmingham and District League was renamed to reflect its actual catchment area.

Clubs
The league featured 20 clubs from the Birmingham & District League previous season, no new clubs joined the league this season.

League table

References

External links

1962–63
W